The 1991 PGA Championship was the 73rd PGA Championship, held August 8–11 at Crooked Stick Golf Club in Carmel, Indiana, a suburb north of Indianapolis. John Daly won the first of his two major titles, three strokes ahead of runner-up Bruce Lietzke.

Daly, age 25, was quite arguably the most unforeseen major champion in modern history. He was the ninth alternate who only qualified after several others pulled out of the tournament. Nick Price withdrew for the birth of his first child and Daly hired his caddy, Jeff "Squeaky" Medlin. Daly's outgoing personality and "grip it and rip it" style of play made him an instant fan favorite. The PGA Championship was his first tour victory.

A spectator, Thomas Weaver, died after being struck by lightning during a weather delay in the first round. It was the second fatality at a major championship in 1991. Two months earlier at the U.S. Open in Minnesota, six people were hit by lightning with one fatality. Daly donated $30,000 to Weaver's family for a college fund. Both daughters went on to graduate from college and one is now a doctor.

Course layout

Source:

Round summaries

First round
Thursday, August 8, 1991

Kenny Knox shot an opening round 67 to take the 18-hole lead alongside reigning Masters champion Ian Woosnam.

Second round
Friday, August 9, 1991

Third round
Saturday, August 10, 1991

Final round
Sunday, August 11, 1991

Source:

Scorecard

Final round

Cumulative tournament scores, relative to par
Source:

Television
After a quarter century with ABC Sports, the PGA Championship returned to CBS Sports in 1991.

References

External links
PGA.com – 1991 PGA Championship

PGA Championship
Golf in Indiana
Carmel, Indiana
PGA Championship
PGA Championship
PGA Championship